Root is a surname, and may refer to:

People
 Alan Root (1937–2017), Anglo-Kenyan wildlife filmmaker
 Amanda Root (born 1963), British actress
 Amos Root (1839–1923), American beekeeper
 Antony Root (born 1954), British scriptwriter and drama producer
 Bill Root (ice hockey) (born 1959), Canadian ice-hockey player
 Bill Root (bridge) (1923–2002), American bridge player
 Billy Root (cricketer) (born 1992), English cricketer
 Budd Root (born 1958), American comic book artist
 Charles W. Root (1899-1968), American lawyer and politician
 Charlie Root (1899–1970), American baseball player
 Edmund Root (1881–1961), American naval officer
 Edward Root (1902–1986), Australian rugby league footballer
 Eleazer Root (1802–1887), American educator and Episcopalian priest
 Elias Root (1806–1880), New York businessman and politician
 Elihu Root (1845–1937), American statesman and 1912 recipient of the Nobel Peace Prize
 Elisha K. Root (1808–1865), American inventor
 Erastus Root (1773–1846), US congressman from, and lieutenant governor of, New York
 Fred Root (1890–1954), English cricketer
 George Frederick Root (1820–1895), American songwriter
 Gladys Root (1905–1982), American criminal defense attorney 
 Gloria Root (1948–2006), American model
 Howard Root (1926–2007), American-born British Anglican priest and theologian
 Jack Root (1873-1963), professional name of American light heavyweight boxing champion Janos Ruthuly
 Jane Root (born 1957), British television executive
 Jesse Root (1736–1822), Chief Justice of the Connecticut Supreme Court
 Jesse L. Root (1860–1947), Associate Justice of the Nebraska Supreme Court
 Jim Root (born 1971), American guitarist
 Jim Root (gridiron football) (1931–2003), American football player and coach
 Joan Root (1936–2006), British (Kenyan-born) ecological activist and Oscar-nominated filmmaker
 Joe Root (born 1990), English cricketer
 Joe Root (hermit) (1860–1912) American hermit from Erie, Pennsylvania
 Joel Root (1770–1847), American author of a journal of his voyage around the world (1802–1806) on a sealing ship
 John B. Root (born 1958), French pornographic filmmaker
 Joseph Pomeroy Root (1826–1885), American doctor, politician, and diplomat
 John Wellborn Root (1850–1891), American architect
 John Wellborn Root Jr. (1887–1963), American architect
 Jon Root (born 1964), American volleyball player
 Leon Root (1929–2015), American physician
 Martha Root (1872–1939), American teacher of the Bahá'í Faith
 Milo A. Root (1863–1917), justice of the Washington Supreme Court
 Olga von Root (1901 – unknown), Russian stage actress and singer
 Richard B. Root (1936–2013), American ecologist, entomologist and evolutionary biologist
 Richard K. Root (1938–2006), American epidemiologist
 Robert Root-Bernstein (born 1953), MacArthur fellow and professor of life sciences at Michigan State University
 Sidney Root (1824–1897), American engineer and businessman
 Stephen Root (born 1951), American actor
 Tina Root (fl. 1980s-2010s), American singer
 Tom Root (born 1973), American Emmy-winning TV writer and producer
 Waverley Root (1903–1982), American journalist
 Wilbur M. Root (1842–1916), American politician
 William Lucas Root (1919–2007), American information theorist
 William Pitt Root (born 1941), American poet

Fictional characters
 Enoch Root, fictional character in The Baroque Cycle novels by Neal Stephenson
 Hugo Root, fictional character in the comic book series Preacher

See also
 Root (disambiguation)
 Rootes (disambiguation)
 Roth (surname)